The Toyota Limo is an automobile offered by Toyota in Southeast Asian markets designed for taxicab use, primarily in Indonesia, Philippines, Thailand and Vietnam. It is a robust low cost, low maintenance variant designed specifically for taxi fleet, with longer service intervals that may be yearly or every . It is essentially a scaled-down variant of the base model Vios and Corolla that lacks any extra equipment. It still retains the same engine of either the Vios or Corolla, but with a specially tuned ECU for more fuel efficient and economical use and softer suspension for comfort.

Vios-based Limo 
The Vios-based Limo is commonly used as a regular taxi by various taxi firms in Indonesia. Like the Vios for private use, the Limo is also powered by the 1.5-liter 1NZ-FE petrol engine.

Prior to the introduction of the Vios in 2003, most taxicabs in Indonesia use a scaled-down version of the Soluna, the Southeast Asian variant of the Tercel. Other cars used of its time includes the second-generation Ford Laser, first-generation Hyundai Accent and Kia Sephia (known in Indonesia as Bimantara Cakra and Timor S5).

 NCP42 (2003)
 NCP93 (2007)
 NCP150 (2014)

The Vios-based Limo's order had stopped in 2016, in favour to the Avanza-based Transmover.

Corolla-based Limo 

Toyota also manufactures the Corolla-based Limo for use as a taxi in Thailand.

 E120 (2003)
 E140 (2008)

See also 
 Taxicabs by country
 Toyota Vios
 Toyota Corolla
 Toyota Comfort and Toyota JPN Taxi, similarly designed vehicles for the Japanese market.

References 

Limo
Taxi vehicles